Dowey is a surname. Notable people with the surname include:

 Murray Dowey (1926–2021), Canadian ice hockey goaltender
 Ralph Dowey (1844–1909), British miner, songwriter and poet
 Sharon Dowey (born 1969/1970), British politician

See also 

 Duffy (surname)

Surnames of British Isles origin
Surnames of Irish origin
Anglicised Irish-language surnames